Rutland is a landlocked ceremonial county in the East Midlands of England. In 1974 it was merged to be part of the administrative county of Leicestershire, but in 1997 it was separated to become a unitary local authority, which is responsible for all local services apart from the police and fire service. It is mainly rural, but has two market towns, Oakham, the county town, and Uppingham.

In England, Sites of Special Scientific Interest (SSSIs) are designated by Natural England, a non-departmental public body which is responsible for protecting England's natural environment. Designation as an SSSI gives legal protection to the most important wildlife and geological sites. As of November 2017, there are 19 SSSIs in the county. Sixteen are designated for their biological importance, one for its geological importance and two under both criteria.

Key

Interest
B = a site of biological interest
G = a site of geological interest

Public access
NO = no public access to site
PP = public access to part of site
YES = public access to the whole or most of the site

Other classifications
GCR = Geological Conservation Review
LRWT = Leicestershire and Rutland Wildlife Trust
NCR = Nature Conservation Review
Ramsar = Ramsar site, an internationally important wetland site
SPA = Special Protection Area under the European Union Directive on the Conservation of Wild Birds

Sites

See also 

 Leicestershire and Rutland Wildlife Trust

Notes

References 

 
Rutland
Sites of Special
Geology of East Midlands